The European Charlemagne Youth Prize, sometimes shortened Charlemagne Youth Prize, is a prize that has been awarded annual since 2008 jointly by the European Parliament and the Foundation of the International Charlemagne Prize of Aachen. It is awarded to projects run by young people between the ages of 16 and 30 that support democracy in Europe and promote cooperation and understanding both in Europe and internationally. Like the Charlemagne Prize, which has existed since 1949, the Youth Prize is named after Charlemagne, ruler of the Frankish Empire and founder of what became the Holy Roman Empire, who is buried in Aachen, Germany.

History
The Charlemagne Youth Prize was created in 2007 as an addition to the Charlemagne Prize. It was created under the direction of then European Parliament President, Hans-Gert Pöttering, who remains as a member of the Board of Directors of the Charlemagne Prize. The Youth Prize was first awarded in a ceremony that took place in Aachen on 29 April 2008. Since then, the prize has been awarded annually in the run-up to the presentation of the Charlemagne Prize.

Procedure of the contest 
The selection of the prize winner takes place in two rounds with national winners first being selected by national-level juries set up by the European Parliament in each member state of the European Union. To be eligible, each project must be run by young people between the ages of 16 and 30 years and be citizens or residents of one of the Member States. Each winning project receives a sum of €1,000 to continue the work of the project.

National winners are invited to the final award ceremony which takes place in Aachen. A final European winner is selected by a jury chaired by the President of the European Parliament and usually consists of members of the Foundation of the International Charlemagne Prize and representatives of International Youth Organisations, such as the European Youth Forum. The jury selects a first, second and third prize with each receiving €5,000, €3,000 and €2,000 respectively towards continuing the project.

Award winners 
The award winning projects generally include youth exchange programmes, artistic projects, media projects and internet projects.

See also

Charlemagne Prize
Charlemagne
European integration

References

External links

Humanitarian and service awards
European Parliament
European Union youth policy
Awards established in 2008
European integration
Orders, decorations, and medals of the European Union
Awards honoring children or youth